The R380 is a Regional Route in South Africa that connects Kathu with the Botswana border at McCarthy's Rest via Hotazel.

From the border, it heads generally south-south-east to Hotazel. Here it crosses the R31 at a staggered junction. It then heads south, by-passing Dibeng to the east, before veering south-east to reach its southern terminus at the N14 at Kathu.

External links
 Routes Travel Info

References

Regional Routes in the Northern Cape